Homestead Steel Works was a large steel works located on the Monongahela River at Homestead, Pennsylvania in the United States. The works was also the site of one of the more serious labor disputes in U.S. history, which became known as the Homestead strike of 1892.

History
The steel works were first constructed in 1881. Andrew Carnegie, (a Scottish emigrant), bought the 2 year old Homestead Steel Works in 1883, and integrated it into his Carnegie Steel Company. For many years, the Homestead Works was the largest steel mill in the world and the most productive of the Mon Valley's many mills.

A series of industrial disputes over wages, working hours and contracts occurred in the early years of the works, leading to the Homestead strike, an industrial lockout and strike which began on June 30, 1892, culminating in a battle between strikers and private security agents on July 6, 1892. The battle was one of the most violent disputes in U.S. labor history and the final result was a major defeat for the union and a setback for their efforts to unionize steelworkers.

In 1896, Carnegie built the Carnegie Library of Homestead in nearby Munhall as part of concessions to the striking workers. (This however has never been validated. Carnegie had the plans drawn up in the late 1880s, and run-ins with the Union bosses kept him from actually building it.)

In 1901, Carnegie sold his operations to U.S. Steel. On January 6, 1906 it was announced that the company would undergo upgrades and expansions worth seven million dollars ($ today.) The workforce peaked at 15,000 during World War II. William J. Gaughan was a Senior Designer of Operations Planning and Control at the company who developed computer systems to aid in automation of various operations. Throughout his management career, Gaughan had developed an interest in the history of Homestead Steel Works and began to collect photos and pamphlets regarding the company. The plant closed in 1986 because of a severe downturn in the domestic steel industry, from which the industry still hasn't recovered.

A few remnants of the steel works were not destroyed, including twelve smokestacks in the middle of the Waterfront development. As of its opening in 1999, the land is partially occupied by The Waterfront, an outdoor shopping center.

See also
 Carrie Furnace

References

External links

Pittsburgh Post-Gazette retrospective
Travel Channel video 1
Travel Channel video 2
Images from Historic Pittsburgh
New York Times article
 — index page + history.

Ironworks and steel mills in Pennsylvania
Homestead, Pennsylvania
Manufacturing companies based in Pennsylvania
Buildings and structures in Allegheny County, Pennsylvania
Industrial buildings and structures in Pennsylvania
Rivers of Steel National Heritage Area
Andrew Carnegie
U.S. Steel
Manufacturing companies established in 1881
Manufacturing companies disestablished in 1986
1881 establishments in Pennsylvania
1986 establishments in Pennsylvania
Defunct companies based in Pennsylvania
Historic American Engineering Record in Pennsylvania